Platychilomonas psammobia is a species of flagellate.

References 

Katablepharida